Henry Lillywhite (31 December 1789 at Hawkley, Hampshire – 30 January 1858 at Ropley, Hampshire) was an English amateur cricketer who played first-class cricket from 1816 to 1825.  He was mainly associated with Hampshire and made seven known appearances in first-class matches.

References

External links

Bibliography
 Arthur Haygarth, Scores & Biographies, Volumes 1-2 (1744–1840), Lillywhite, 1862

1789 births
1858 deaths
English cricketers
English cricketers of 1787 to 1825
Hampshire cricketers
People from East Hampshire District
People from Ropley